Socialism is a political philosophy and movement encompassing a range of economic and social systems, which are characterised by social ownership of the means of production, as opposed to private ownership. As a term, it describes the economic, political, and social theories and movements associated with the implementation of such systems. Social ownership can be public, community, collective, cooperative, or employee. While no single definition encapsulates the many types of socialism, social ownership is the one common element, and is considered left-wing. Different types of socialism vary based on the role of markets and planning in resource allocation, on the structure of management in organizations, and from below or from above approaches, with some socialists favouring a party, state, or technocratic-driven approach. Socialists disagree on whether government, particularly existing government, is the correct vehicle for change.

Socialist systems are divided into non-market and market forms. Non-market socialism substitutes factor markets and often money with integrated economic planning and engineering or technical criteria based on calculation performed in-kind, thereby producing a different economic mechanism that functions according to different economic laws and dynamics than those of capitalism. A non-market socialist system seeks to eliminate the perceived inefficiencies, irrationalities, unpredictability, and crises that socialists traditionally associate with capital accumulation and the profit system in capitalism. By contrast, market socialism retains the use of monetary prices, factor markets and in some cases the profit motive, with respect to the operation of socially owned enterprises and the allocation of capital goods between them. Profits generated by these firms would be controlled directly by the workforce of each firm or accrue to society at large in the form of a social dividend. Anarchism and libertarian socialism oppose the use of the state as a means to establish socialism, favouring decentralisation above all, whether to establish non-market socialism or market socialism.

Socialist politics has been both internationalist and nationalist; organised through political parties and opposed to party politics; at times overlapping with trade unions and at other times independent and critical of them, and present in both industrialised and developing nations. Social democracy originated within the socialist movement, supporting economic and social interventions to promote social justice. While retaining socialism as a long-term goal, since the post-war period it came to embrace a mixed economy based on Keynesianism within a predominantly developed capitalist market economy and liberal democratic polity that expands state intervention to include income redistribution, regulation, and a welfare state. Economic democracy proposes a sort of market socialism, with more democratic control of companies, currencies, investments, and natural resources.

The socialist political movement includes a set of political philosophies that originated in the revolutionary movements of the mid-to-late 18th century and out of concern for the social problems that were associated with capitalism. By the late 19th century, after the work of Karl Marx and his collaborator Friedrich Engels, socialism had come to signify anti-capitalism and advocacy for a post-capitalist system based on some form of social ownership of the means of production. By the early 1920s, communism and social democracy had become the two dominant political tendencies within the international socialist movement, with socialism itself becoming the most influential secular movement of the 20th century. Socialist parties and ideas remain a political force with varying degrees of power and influence on all continents, heading national governments in many countries around the world. Many socialists also adopted the causes of other social movements, such as feminism, environmentalism, and progressivism.

While the emergence of the Soviet Union as the world's first nominally socialist state led to socialism's widespread association with the Soviet economic model, several scholars posit that in practice, the model functioned as a form of state capitalism. Several academics, political commentators, and scholars have distinguished between authoritarian socialist and democratic socialist states, with the first representing the Eastern Bloc and the latter representing Western Bloc countries which have been democratically governed by socialist parties such as Britain, France, Sweden, and Western countries in general, among others. Following the end of the Cold War, many of these countries have moved away from socialism as a neoliberal consensus replaced the social democratic consensus in the advanced capitalist world.

Etymology 
For Andrew Vincent, "[t]he word 'socialism' finds its root in the Latin , which means to combine or to share. This latter word could mean companionship and fellowship as well as the more legalistic idea of a consensual contract between freemen".

Initial use of socialism was claimed by Pierre Leroux, who alleged he first used the term in the Parisian journal  in 1832. Leroux was a follower of Henri de Saint-Simon, one of the founders of what would later be labelled utopian socialism. Socialism contrasted with the liberal doctrine of individualism that emphasized the moral worth of the individual whilst stressing that people act or should act as if they are in isolation from one another. The original utopian socialists condemned this doctrine of individualism for failing to address social concerns during the Industrial Revolution, including poverty, oppression, and vast wealth inequality. They viewed their society as harming community life by basing society on competition. They presented socialism as an alternative to liberal individualism based on the shared ownership of resources. Saint-Simon proposed economic planning, scientific administration and the application of scientific understanding to the organisation of society. By contrast, Robert Owen proposed to organise production and ownership via cooperatives. Socialism is also attributed in France to Marie Roch Louis Reybaud while in Britain it is attributed to Owen, who became one of the fathers of the cooperative movement.

The definition and usage of socialism settled by the 1860s, replacing associationist, co-operative, and mutualist that had been used as synonyms while communism fell out of use during this period. An early distinction between communism and socialism was that the latter aimed to only socialise production while the former aimed to socialise both production and consumption (in the form of free access to final goods). By 1888, Marxists employed socialism in place of communism as the latter had come to be considered an old-fashioned synonym for socialism. It was not until after the Bolshevik Revolution that socialism was appropriated by Vladimir Lenin to mean a stage between capitalism and communism. He used it to defend the Bolshevik program from Marxist criticism that Russia's productive forces were not sufficiently developed for communism. The distinction between communism and socialism became salient in 1918 after the Russian Social Democratic Labour Party renamed itself to the All-Russian Communist Party, interpreting communism specifically to mean socialists who supported the politics and theories of Bolshevism, Leninism and later that of Marxism–Leninism, although communist parties continued to describe themselves as socialists dedicated to socialism. According to The Oxford Handbook of Karl Marx, "Marx used many terms to refer to a post-capitalist society—positive humanism, socialism, Communism, realm of free individuality, free association of producers, etc. He used these terms completely interchangeably. The notion that 'socialism' and 'Communism' are distinct historical stages is alien to his work and only entered the lexicon of Marxism after his death".

In Christian Europe, communists were believed to have adopted atheism. In Protestant England, communism was too close to the Roman Catholic communion rite, hence socialist was the preferred term. Engels wrote that in 1848, when The Communist Manifesto was published, socialism was respectable in Europe while communism was not. The Owenites in England and the Fourierists in France were considered respectable socialists while working-class movements that "proclaimed the necessity of total social change" denoted themselves communists. This branch of socialism produced the communist work of Étienne Cabet in France and Wilhelm Weitling in Germany. British moral philosopher John Stuart Mill discussed a form of economic socialism within a liberal context that would later be known as liberal socialism. In later editions of his Principles of Political Economy (1848), Mill posited that "as far as economic theory was concerned, there is nothing in principle in economic theory that precludes an economic order based on socialist policies" and promoted substituting capitalist businesses with worker cooperatives. While democrats looked to the Revolutions of 1848 as a democratic revolution which in the long run ensured liberty, equality, and fraternity, Marxists denounced it as a betrayal of working-class ideals by a bourgeoisie indifferent to the proletariat.

History

Early socialism 

Socialist models and ideas espousing common or public ownership have existed since antiquity. The economy of the 3rd century BCE Mauryan Empire of India, an absolute monarchy, has been described by some scholars as "a socialized monarchy" and "a sort of state socialism" due to "nationalisation of industries". Other scholars have suggested that elements of socialist thought were present in the politics of classical Greek philosophers Plato and Aristotle. Mazdak the Younger (died c. 524 or 528 CE), a Persian communal proto-socialist, instituted communal possessions and advocated the public good. Abu Dharr al-Ghifari, a Companion of Muhammad, is credited by multiple authors as a principal antecedent of Islamic socialism. The teachings of Jesus are frequently described as socialist, especially by Christian socialists. In the Bible, Acts 4:35 records that in the early church in Jerusalem "[n]o one claimed that any of their possessions was their own", although the pattern soon disappears from church history except within monasticism. Christian socialism was one of the founding threads of the British Labour Party and is claimed to begin with the uprising of Wat Tyler and John Ball in the 14th century CE. After the French Revolution, activists and theorists such as François-Noël Babeuf, Étienne-Gabriel Morelly, Philippe Buonarroti and Auguste Blanqui influenced the early French labour and socialist movements. In Britain, Thomas Paine proposed a detailed plan to tax property owners to pay for the needs of the poor in Agrarian Justice while Charles Hall wrote The Effects of Civilization on the People in European States, denouncing capitalism's effects on the poor of his time. This work influenced the utopian schemes of Thomas Spence.

The first self-conscious socialist movements developed in the 1820s and 1830s. Groups such as the Fourierists, Owenites and Saint-Simonians provided a series of analyses and interpretations of society. Especially the Owenites overlapped with other working-class movements such as the Chartists in the United Kingdom. This was also the first time that the term socialism itself applies in a fashion recognisably similar to its modern meaning; the word was first used in 1827 in the London Cooperative Magazine in the UK and later in 1832 in the French periodical Le Globe. An earlier usage of the word socialism appears in the Italian language in 1803, but not with the modern meaning of the term.

The Chartists gathered significant numbers around the People's Charter of 1838 which sought democratic reforms focused on the extension of suffrage to all male adults. Leaders in the movement called for a more equitable distribution of income and better living conditions for the working classes. The first trade unions and consumer cooperative societies followed the Chartist movement. Pierre-Joseph Proudhon proposed his philosophy of mutualism in which "everyone had an equal claim, either alone or as part of a small cooperative, to possess and use land and other resources as needed to make a living". Other currents inspired Christian socialism "often in Britain and then usually coming out of left liberal politics and a romantic anti-industrialism" which produced theorists such as Edward Bellamy, Charles Kingsley and Frederick Denison Maurice.

The first advocates of socialism favoured social levelling in order to create a meritocratic or technocratic society based on individual talent. Henri de Saint-Simon was fascinated by the potential of science and technology and advocated a socialist society that would eliminate the disorderly aspects of capitalism based on equal opportunities. He sought a society in which each person was ranked according to his or her capacities and rewarded according to his or her work. His key focus was on administrative efficiency and industrialism and a belief that science was essential to progress. This was accompanied by a desire for a rationally organised economy based on planning and geared towards large-scale scientific and material progress.

West European social critics, including Louis Blanc, Charles Fourier, Charles Hall, Robert Owen, Pierre-Joseph Proudhon and Saint-Simon were the first modern socialists who criticised the poverty and inequality of the Industrial Revolution. They advocated reform, Owen advocating the transformation of society to small communities without private property. Owen's contribution to modern socialism was his claim that individual actions and characteristics were largely determined by their social environment. On the other hand, Fourier advocated Phalanstères (communities that respected individual desires, including sexual preferences), affinities and creativity and saw that work has to be made enjoyable for people. Owen and Fourier's ideas were practiced in intentional communities around Europe and North America in the mid-19th century.

Paris Commune 

The Paris Commune was a government that ruled Paris from 18 March (formally, from 28 March) to 28 May 1871. The Commune was the result of an uprising in Paris after France was defeated in the Franco-Prussian War. The Commune elections were held on 26 March. They elected a Commune council of 92 members, one member for each 20,000 residents.

Because the Commune was able to meet on fewer than 60 days in total, only a few decrees were actually implemented. These included the separation of church and state; the remission of rents owed for the period of the siege (during which payment had been suspended); the abolition of night work in the hundreds of Paris bakeries; the granting of pensions to the unmarried companions and children of National Guards killed on active service; and the free return of all workmen's tools and household items valued up to 20 francs that had been pledged during the siege.

First International 

In 1864, the First International was founded in London. It united diverse revolutionary currents, including socialists such as the French followers of Proudhon, Blanquists, Philadelphes, English trade unionists and social democrats. In 1865 and 1866, it held a preliminary conference and had its first congress in Geneva, respectively. Due to their wide variety of philosophies, conflict immediately erupted. The first objections to Marx came from the mutualists who opposed state socialism. Shortly after Mikhail Bakunin and his followers joined in 1868, the First International became polarised into camps headed by Marx and Bakunin. The clearest differences between the groups emerged over their proposed strategies for achieving their visions. The First International became the first major international forum for the promulgation of socialist ideas.

Bakunin's followers were called collectivists and sought to collectivise ownership of the means of production while retaining payment proportional to the amount and kind of labour of each individual. Like Proudhonists, they asserted the right of each individual to the product of his labour and to be remunerated for his particular contribution to production. By contrast, anarcho-communists sought collective ownership of both the means and the products of labour. As Errico Malatesta put it, "instead of running the risk of making a confusion in trying to distinguish what you and I each do, let us all work and put everything in common. In this way each will give to society all that his strength permits until enough is produced for every one; and each will take all that he needs, limiting his needs only in those things of which there is not yet plenty for every one". Anarcho-communism as a coherent economic-political philosophy was first formulated in the Italian section of the First International by Malatesta, Carlo Cafiero, Emilio Covelli, Andrea Costa and other ex-Mazzinian republicans. Out of respect for Bakunin, they did not make their differences with collectivist anarchism explicit until after his death.

Syndicalism emerged in France inspired in part by Proudhon and later by Pelloutier and Georges Sorel. It developed at the end of the 19th century out of the French trade-union movement (syndicat is the French word for trade union). It was a significant force in Italy and Spain in the early 20th century until it was crushed by the fascist regimes in those countries. In the United States, syndicalism appeared in the guise of the Industrial Workers of the World, or "Wobblies", founded in 1905. Syndicalism is an economic system that organises industries into confederations (syndicates) and the economy is managed by negotiation between specialists and worker representatives of each field, comprising multiple non-competitive categorised units. Syndicalism is a form of communism and economic corporatism, but also refers to the political movement and tactics used to bring about this type of system. An influential anarchist movement based on syndicalist ideas is anarcho-syndicalism. The International Workers Association is an international anarcho-syndicalist federation of various labour unions.

The Fabian Society is a British socialist organisation established to advance socialism via gradualist and reformist means. The society laid many foundations of the Labour Party and subsequently affected the policies of states emerging from the decolonisation of the British Empire, most notably India and Singapore. Originally, the Fabian Society was committed to the establishment of a socialist economy, alongside a commitment to British imperialism as a progressive and modernising force. Later, the society functioned primarily as a think tank and is one of fifteen socialist societies affiliated with the Labour Party. Similar societies exist in Australia (the Australian Fabian Society), in Canada (the Douglas-Coldwell Foundation and the now disbanded League for Social Reconstruction) and in New Zealand.

Guild socialism is a political movement advocating workers' control of industry through the medium of trade-related guilds "in an implied contractual relationship with the public". It originated in the United Kingdom and was at its most influential in the first quarter of the 20th century. Inspired by medieval guilds, theorists such as Samuel George Hobson and G. D. H. Cole advocated the public ownership of industries and their workforces' organisation into guilds, each of which under the democratic control of its trade union. Guild socialists were less inclined than Fabians to invest power in a state. At some point, like the American Knights of Labor, guild socialism wanted to abolish the wage system.

Second International 

As the ideas of Marx and Engels gained acceptance, particularly in central Europe, socialists sought to unite in an international organisation. In 1889 (the centennial of the French Revolution), the Second International was founded, with 384 delegates from twenty countries representing about 300 labour and socialist organisations. Engels was elected honorary president at the third congress in 1893. Anarchists were banned, mainly due to pressure from Marxists. It has been argued that at some point the Second International turned "into a battleground over the issue of libertarian versus authoritarian socialism. Not only did they effectively present themselves as champions of minority rights; they also provoked the German Marxists into demonstrating a dictatorial intolerance which was a factor in preventing the British labour movement from following the Marxist direction indicated by such leaders as H. M. Hyndman".

Reformism arose as an alternative to revolution. Eduard Bernstein was a leading social democrat in Germany who proposed the concept of evolutionary socialism. Revolutionary socialists quickly targeted reformism: Rosa Luxemburg condemned Bernstein's Evolutionary Socialism in her 1900 essay Social Reform or Revolution? Revolutionary socialism encompasses multiple social and political movements that may define "revolution" differently. The Social Democratic Party of Germany (SPD) became the largest and most powerful socialist party in Europe, despite working illegally until the anti-socialist laws were dropped in 1890. In the 1893 elections, it gained 1,787,000 votes, a quarter of the total votes cast, according to Engels. In 1895, the year of his death, Engels emphasised The Communist Manifesto emphasis on winning, as a first step, the "battle of democracy".

In South America, the Socialist Party of Argentina was established in the 1890s led by Juan B. Justo and Nicolás Repetto, among others. It was the first mass party in the country and in Latin America. The party affiliated itself with the Second International.

Early 20th century 

For four months in 1904, Australian Labor Party leader Chris Watson was the Prime Minister of the country. Watson thus became the head of the world's first socialist or social democratic parliamentary government. Australian historian Geoffrey Blainey argues that the Labor Party was not socialist at all in the 1890s, and that socialist and collectivist elements only made their way in the party's platform in the early 20th century.

In 1909, the first Kibbutz was established in Palestine by Russian Jewish Immigrants. The Kibbutz Movement expanded through the 20th century following a doctrine of Zionist socialism. The British Labour Party first won seats in the House of Commons in 1902.

By 1917, the patriotism of World War I changed into political radicalism in Australia, most of Europe and the United States. Other socialist parties from around the world who were beginning to gain importance in their national politics in the early 20th century included the Italian Socialist Party, the French Section of the Workers' International, the Spanish Socialist Workers' Party, the Swedish Social Democratic Party, the Russian Social Democratic Labour Party and the Socialist Party in Argentina, the Socialist Workers' Party in Chile and the Socialist Party of America in the United States.

Russian Revolution 

In February 1917, a revolution occurred in Russia. Workers, soldiers and peasants established soviets (councils), the monarchy fell and a provisional government convened pending the election of a constituent assembly. In April of that year, Vladimir Lenin, leader of the Bolshevik faction of socialists in Russia and known for his profound and controversial expansions of Marxism, was allowed to cross Germany to return from exile in Switzerland.

Lenin had published essays on his analysis of imperialism, the monopoly and globalisation phase of capitalism, as well as analyses on social conditions. He observed that as capitalism had further developed in Europe and America, the workers remained unable to gain class consciousness so long as they were too busy working to pay their expenses. He therefore proposed that the social revolution would require the leadership of a vanguard party of class-conscious revolutionaries from the educated and politically active part of the population.

Upon arriving in Petrograd, Lenin declared that the revolution in Russia had only begun, and that the next step was for the workers' soviets to take full authority. He issued a thesis outlining the Bolshevik programme, including rejection of any legitimacy in the provisional government and advocacy for state power to be administered through the soviets. The Bolsheviks became the most influential force. On 7 November, the capitol of the provisional government was stormed by Bolshevik Red Guards in what later was officially known in the Soviet Union as the Great October Socialist Revolution. The provisional government ended and the Russian Socialist Federative Soviet Republic—the world's first constitutionally socialist state—was established. On 25 January 1918, Lenin declared "Long live the world socialist revolution!" at the Petrograd Soviet and proposed an immediate armistice on all fronts and transferred the land of the landed proprietors, the crown and the monasteries to the peasant committees without compensation.

The day after assuming executive power on 25 January, Lenin wrote Draft Regulations on Workers' Control, which granted workers control of businesses with more than five workers and office employees and access to all books, documents and stocks and whose decisions were to be "binding upon the owners of the enterprises". Governing through the elected soviets and in alliance with the peasant-based Left Socialist-Revolutionaries, the Bolshevik government began nationalising banks and industry; and disavowed the national debts of the deposed Romanov royal régime. It sued for peace, withdrawing from World War I and convoked a Constituent Assembly in which the peasant Socialist-Revolutionary Party (SR) won a majority.

The Constituent Assembly elected SR leader Victor Chernov President of a Russian republic, but rejected the Bolshevik proposal that it endorse the Soviet decrees on land, peace and workers' control and acknowledge the power of the Soviets of Workers', Soldiers' and Peasants' Deputies. The next day, the Bolsheviks declared that the assembly was elected on outdated party lists and the All-Russian Central Executive Committee of the Soviets dissolved it. In March 1919, world communist parties formed Comintern (also known as the Third International) at a meeting in Moscow.

In the period before World War II, Soviet Union experienced two major famines. The First famine occurred in 1921-1922 with death estimates varying between 1 and 10 million dead. It was caused by a combination of factors - severe drought and failed harvests, continuous war since 1914, forced collectivisation of farms and requisition of grain and seed from peasants (preventing the sowing of crops) by the Soviet authorities, and an economic blockade of the Soviet Union by the Allies. The experience with the famine led Lenin to replace war communism with the New Economic Policy (NEP) in 1921 to alleviate the extreme shortages. Under the NEP, private ownership was allowed for small and medium-sized enterprises. While large industry remained state-controlled.

A second major famine occurred in 1930-1933, resulting in millions of deaths.

The Soviet economy was the modern world's first centrally planned economy. It adopted state ownership of industry managed through Gosplan (the State Planning Commission), Gosbank (the State Bank) and the Gossnab (State Commission for Materials and Equipment Supply). Economic planning was conducted through serial Five-Year Plans. The emphasis was on development of heavy industry at expense of agriculture. Rapid industrialization served two purposes: to bring largely agrarian societies into the modern age, and to establish a politically loyal working class. Modernization brought about a general increase in the standard of living in the 1950s and 60's.

Third International and the revolutionary wave 

The Bolshevik Russian Revolution of January 1918 launched Communist parties in many countries and a wave of revolutions until the mid-1920s. Few communists doubted that the Russian experience depended on successful, working-class socialist revolutions in developed capitalist countries. In 1919, Lenin and Leon Trotsky organised the world's Communist parties into an international association of workers—the Communist International (Comintern), also called the Third International.

The Russian Revolution influenced uprisings in other countries. The German Revolution of 1918–1919 replaced Germany's imperial government with a republic. The revolution lasted from November 1918 until the establishment of the Weimar Republic in August 1919. It included an episode known as the Bavarian Soviet Republic and the Spartacist uprising. A short lived Hungarian Soviet Republic was set up in Hungary March 21 to August 1, 1919. It was led by Béla Kun. It instituted a Red Terror. After the regime was put down, an even more brutal White Terror followed. Kun managed to escape to the Soviet Union, where he co-led murder of tens of thousands of White Russians. He was killed in the 1930 Soviet purges.

In Italy, the events known as the Biennio Rosso were characterised by mass strikes, worker demonstrations and self-management experiments through land and factory occupations. In Turin and Milan, workers' councils were formed and many factory occupations took place led by anarcho-syndicalists organised around the Unione Sindacale Italiana.

There was a short-lived Persian Socialist Soviet Republic in 1920–21. Patagonia Rebelde was a syndicalist-led revolution in Argentina lasting for a year and a half from in 1920–21. The anarchist-led Guangzhou City Commune in China lasted six years from 1921. In 1924, the Mongolian People's Republic was established and was ruled by the Mongolian People's Party. The Shinmin Prefecture in Manchuria lasted two years from 1929. Many of these revolutions initiated societies and economic models that have been described as socialist.

4th World Congress of the Communist International 

In 1922, the fourth congress of the Communist International took up the policy of the united front. It urged communists to work with rank and file social democrats while remaining critical of their leaders. They criticised those leaders for betraying the working class by supporting the capitalists' war efforts. The social democrats pointed to the dislocation caused by revolution and later the growing authoritarianism of the communist parties. The Labour Party rejected the Communist Party of Great Britain's application to affiliate to them in 1920.

On seeing the Soviet State's growing coercive power in 1923, a dying Lenin said Russia had reverted to "a bourgeois tsarist machine ... barely varnished with socialism". After Lenin's death in January 1924, the Communist Party of the Soviet Union—then increasingly under the control of Joseph Stalin—rejected the theory that socialism could not be built solely in the Soviet Union in favour of the concept of socialism in one country. Despite the marginalised Left Opposition's demand for the restoration of Soviet democracy, Stalin developed a bureaucratic, authoritarian government that was condemned by democratic socialists and anarchists for undermining the Revolution's ideals.

The Russian Revolution and its aftermath motivated national Communist parties elsewhere that gained political and social influence, in France, the United States, Italy, China, Mexico, the Brazil, Chile and Indonesia.

Left-wing groups which did not agree to the centralisation and abandonment of the soviets by the Bolshevik Party (see anti-Stalinist left) led left-wing uprisings against the Bolsheviks. Such groups included Socialist Revolutionaries, Left Socialist Revolutionaries, Mensheviks and anarchists. Within this left-wing discontent, the most large-scale events were the Kronstadt rebellion and the Makhnovist movement.

The Second International and the Two-and-a-Half International 

The International Socialist Commission (ISC, also known as Berne International) was formed in February 1919 at a meeting in Bern by parties that wanted to resurrect the Second International. Centrist socialist parties which did not want to be a part of the resurrected Second International (ISC) or Comintern formed the International Working Union of Socialist Parties (IWUSP, also known as Vienna International, Vienna Union, or Two-and-a-Half International) on 27 February 1921 at a conference in Vienna. The ISC and the IWUSP joined to form the Labour and Socialist International (LSI) in May 1923 at a meeting in Hamburg.

From the Great Depression to the World War 
The 1920s and 1930s were marked by an increasing divergence between democratic and reformists socialists (mainly affiliated with the Labour and Socialist International) and revolutionary socialists (mainly affiliated with the Communist International), but also by tension within the Communist movement between the dominant Stalinists and dissidents such as Trotsky's followers in the Left Opposition. Trotsky's Fourth International was established in France in 1938 when Trotskyists argued that the Comintern or Third International had become irretrievably "lost to Stalinism" and thus incapable of leading the working class to power.

Spanish Civil War 

In the Spanish Civil War (1936–1939), socialists (including the democratic socialist Spanish Socialist Workers' Party and the Marxist Workers' Party of Marxist Unification) participated on the Republican side, loyal to the left-leaning Popular Front government of the Second Spanish Republic, in alliance with anarchists of the communist and syndicalist variety and supported by the socialist Workers' General Union.

The Spanish Revolution of 1936 was a workers' social revolution during the war, that is often seen as a model of socialism from below. An anarchist-inspired movement of peasants and workers, supported by armed militias, took control of Barcelona and of large areas of rural Spain where they collectivised the land. The Spanish Revolution was a workers' social revolution that began with the Spanish Civil War in 1936 and resulted in the widespread implementation of anarchist and more broadly libertarian socialist organisational principles in some areas for two to three years, primarily Catalonia, Aragon, Andalusia and parts of Levante. Much of Spain's economy came under worker control. In anarchist strongholds like Catalonia the figure was as high as 75%, but lower in areas with heavy Communist Party influence, which actively resisted attempts at collectivisation. Factories were run through worker committees, agrarian areas became collectivised and run as libertarian communes. Anarchist historian Sam Dolgoff estimated that about eight million people participated directly or indirectly in the Spanish Revolution.

Mid-20th century

Post-World War II 

The rise of Nazism and the start of World War II led to the dissolution of the LSI in 1940. After the War, the Socialist International was formed in Frankfurt in July 1951 as its successor.

After World War II, social democratic governments introduced social reform and wealth redistribution via welfare and taxation. Social democratic parties dominated post-war politics in countries such as France, Italy, Czechoslovakia, Belgium and Norway. At one point, France claimed to be the world's most state-controlled capitalist country. It nationalised public utilities including Charbonnages de France (CDF), Électricité de France (EDF), Gaz de France (GDF), Air France, Banque de France and Régie Nationale des Usines Renault.

In 1945, the British Labour Party led by Clement Attlee was elected based on a radical socialist programme. The Labour government nationalised industries including mines, gas, coal, electricity, rail, iron, steel and the Bank of England. British Petroleum was officially nationalised in 1951. Anthony Crosland said that in 1956 25% of British industry was nationalised and that public employees, including those in nationalised industries, constituted a similar proportion of the country's workers. The Labour Governments of 1964–1970 and 1974–1979 intervened further. It re-nationalised British Steel (1967) after the Conservatives had denationalised it and nationalised British Leyland (1976). The National Health Service provided taxpayer-funded health care to everyone, free at the point of service. Working-class housing was provided in council housing estates and university education became available via a school grant system.

Nordic countries 

During most of the post-war era, Sweden was governed by the Swedish Social Democratic Party largely in cooperation with trade unions and industry. The party held power from 1936 to 1976, 1982 to 1991, 1994 to 2006 and 2014 to 2022, most often in minority governments. Party leader Tage Erlander led the government from 1946 to 1969, the longest uninterrupted parliamentary government. These governments substantially expanded the welfare state. Swedish Prime Minister Olof Palme identified as a "democratic socialist" and was described as a "revolutionary reformist".

The Norwegian Labour Party was established in 1887 and was largely a trade union federation. The party did not proclaim a socialist agenda, elevating universal suffrage and dissolution of the union with Sweden as its top priorities. In 1899, the Norwegian Confederation of Trade Unions separated from the Labour Party. Around the time of the Russian Revolution, the Labour Party moved to the left and joined the Communist International from 1919 through 1923. Thereafter, the party still regarded itself as revolutionary, but the party's left-wing broke away and established the Communist Party of Norway while the Labour Party gradually adopted a reformist line around 1930. In 1935, Johan Nygaardsvold established a coalition that lasted until 1945.

From 1946 to 1962, the Norwegian Labour Party held an absolute majority in the parliament led by Einar Gerhardsen, who remained Prime Minister for seventeen years. Although the party abandoned most of its pre-war socialist ideas, the welfare state was expanded under Gerhardsen to ensure the universal provision of basic human rights and stabilise the economy. In the 1945 Norwegian parliamentary election, the Communist Party took 12% of the votes, but it largely vanished during the Cold War. In the 1950s, popular socialism emerged in Nordic countries. It placed itself between communism and social democracy. In the early 1960s, the Socialist Left Party challenged the Labour Party from the left. Also in the 1960s, Gerhardsen established a planning agency and tried to establish a planned economy. In the 1970s, a more radical socialist party, the Worker's Communist Party (AKP), broke from the Socialist Left Party and had notable influence in student associations and some trade unions. The AKP identified with Communist China and Albania rather than the Soviet Union.

In countries such as Sweden, the Rehn–Meidner model allowed capitalists owning productive and efficient firms to retain profits at the expense of the firms' workers, exacerbating inequality and causing workers to agitate for a share of the profits in the 1970s. At that time, women working in the state sector began to demand better wages. Rudolf Meidner established a study committee that came up with a 1976 proposal to transfer excess profits into worker-controlled investment funds, with the intention that firms would create jobs and pay higher wages rather than reward company owners and managers. Capitalists immediately labeled this proposal as socialism and launched an unprecedented opposition—including calling off the class compromise established in the 1938 Saltsjöbaden Agreement. Social democratic parties are some of the oldest such parties and operate in all Nordic countries. Countries or political systems that have long been dominated by social democratic parties are often labelled social democratic. Those countries fit the social democratic type of "high socialism" which is described as favouring "a high level of decommodification and a low degree of stratification".

The Nordic model is a form of economic-political system common to the Nordic countries (Denmark, Finland, Iceland, Norway and Sweden). It has three main ingredients, namely peaceful, institutionalised negotiation between employers and trade unions; active, predictable and measured macroeconomic policy; and universal welfare and free education. The welfare system is governmental in Norway and Sweden whereas trade unions play a greater role in Denmark, Finland and Iceland. The Nordic universal welfare model is often labelled social democratic and contrasted with the selective continental model and the residual Anglo-American model. Major reforms in the Nordic countries are the results of consensus and compromise across the political spectrum. Key reforms were implemented under social democratic cabinets in Denmark, Norway and Sweden while centre-right parties dominated during the implementation of the model in Finland and Iceland. Since World War II, Nordic countries have largely maintained a social democratic mixed economy, characterised by labour force participation, gender equality, egalitarian and universal benefits, redistribution of wealth and expansionary fiscal policy. In 2015, then-Prime Minister of Denmark Lars Løkke Rasmussen denied that Denmark is socialist, saying "I know that some people in the US associate the Nordic model with some sort of socialism. Therefore I would like to make one thing clear. Denmark is far from a socialist planned economy. Denmark is a market economy".

In Norway, the first mandatory social insurances were introduced by conservative cabinets in 1895 (Francis Hagerups's cabinet) and 1911 (Konow's Cabinet). During the 1930s, the Labour Party adopted the conservatives' welfare state project. After World War II, all political parties agreed that the welfare state should be expanded. Universal social security was introduced by the conservative Borten's Cabinet. Norway's economy is open to the international or European market for most products and services, joining the European Union's internal market in 1994 through European Economic Area. Some of the mixed economy institutions from the post-war period were relaxed by the conservative cabinet of the 1980s and the finance market was deregulated. Within the Varieties of Capitalism-framework, Finland, Norway and Sweden are identified as coordinated market economies.

Soviet Union and Eastern Europe 

The Soviet era saw competition between the Soviet-led Eastern Bloc and the United States-led Western Bloc. The Soviet system was seen as a rival of and a threat to Western capitalism for most of the 20th century.

The Eastern Bloc was the group of Communist states of Central and Eastern Europe, including the Soviet Union and the countries of the Warsaw Pact, including Poland, the German Democratic Republic, the Hungary, Bulgaria, Czechoslovakia, Romania, Albania, and initially Yugoslavia. In the Informbiro period from 1948, Yugoslavia under Josip Broz Tito pursued a different, more decentralised form of state socialism than the rest of the Eastern Bloc, known as Socialist self-management.

The Hungarian Revolution of 1956, a spontaneous nationwide revolt against the Communist government brutally suppressed by Soviet forces, and USSR leader Nikita Khrushchev's denunciation of the excesses of Stalin's regime during the Twentieth Communist Party Congress the same year produced disunity within Western European Communist parties, leading to the emergence of the New Left (see below). Over a decade later, Czechoslovakia under Alexander Dubček also attempted to pursue a more democratic model of state socialism, under the name "Socialism with a human face", during the Prague Spring; this was also brutally suppressed by the Soviet Union.

Asia, Africa, and Latin America 

In the post-war years, socialism became increasingly influential in many then-developing countries. Embracing Third World socialism, countries in Africa, Asia and Latin America often nationalised industries. During India's freedom movement and fight for independence, many figures in the left-wing faction of the Indian National Congress organised themselves as the Congress Socialist Party. Their politics and those of the early and intermediate periods of Jayaprakash Narayan's career combined a commitment to the socialist transformation of society with a principled opposition to the one-party authoritarianism they perceived in the Stalinist model.

The Chinese Communist Revolution was the second stage in the Chinese Civil War, which ended with the establishment of the People's Republic of China led by the Chinese Communist Party. The then-Chinese Kuomintang Party in the 1920s incorporated Chinese socialism as part of its ideology. Between 1958 and 1962 during the Great Leap Forward in the People's Republic of China, some 30 million people starved to death and at least 45 million died overall.

The emergence of this new political entity in the frame of the Cold War was complex and painful. Several tentative efforts were made to organise newly independent states in order to establish a common front to limit the United States' and the Soviet Union's influence on them. This led to the Sino-Soviet split. The Non-Aligned Movement gathered around the figures of Jawaharlal Nehru of India, Sukarno of Indonesia, Josip Broz Tito of Yugoslavia and Gamal Abdel Nasser of Egypt. After the 1954 Geneva Conference which ended the French war in Vietnam, the 1955 Bandung Conference gathered Nasser, Nehru, Tito, Sukarno and Chinese Premier Zhou Enlai. As many African countries gained independence during the 1960s, some of them rejected capitalism in favour of African socialism as defined by Julius Nyerere of Tanzania, Léopold Senghor of Senegal, Kwame Nkrumah of Ghana and Sékou Touré of Guinea.

The Cuban Revolution (1953–1959) was an armed revolt conducted by Fidel Castro's 26th of July Movement and its allies against the government of Fulgencio Batista. Castro's government eventually adopted communism, becoming the Communist Party of Cuba in October 1965.

In Indonesia in the mid-1960s, a coup attempt blamed on the Communist Party of Indonesia (PKI) was countered by an anti-communist purge led by Suharto, which mainly targeted the growing influence of the PKI and other leftist groups, with significant support from the United States, which culminated in the overthrow of Sukarno. These events resulted not only in the total destruction of the PKI but also the political left in Indonesia, and paved the way for a major shift in the balance of power in Southeast Asia towards the West, a significant turning point in the global Cold War.

New Left 

The New Left was a term used mainly in the United Kingdom and United States in reference to activists, educators and others in the 1960s and 1970s who sought to implement a broad range of reforms on issues such as gay rights, abortion, gender roles and drugs in contrast to earlier leftist or Marxist movements that had taken a more vanguardist approach to social justice and focused mostly on labour unionisation and questions of social class. The New Left rejected involvement with the labour movement and Marxism's historical theory of class struggle.

In the United States, the New Left was associated with the Hippie movement and anti-war college campus protest movements as well as the black liberation movements such as the Black Panther Party. While initially formed in opposition to the "Old Left" Democratic Party, groups composing the New Left gradually became central players in the Democratic coalition.

Protests of 1968 

The protests of 1968 represented a worldwide escalation of social conflicts, predominantly characterised by popular rebellions against military, capitalist and bureaucratic elites who responded with an escalation of political repression. These protests marked a turning point for the civil rights movement in the United States which produced revolutionary movements like the Black Panther Party. The prominent civil rights leader Martin Luther King Jr. organised the "Poor People's Campaign" to address issues of economic justice, while personally showing sympathy with democratic socialism. In reaction to the Tet Offensive, protests also sparked a broad movement in opposition to the Vietnam War all over the United States and even into London, Paris, Berlin and Rome. In 1968, the International of Anarchist Federations was founded during a conference held in Carrara by the three existing European federations of France, the Italian and the Iberian Anarchist Federation as well as the Bulgarian federation in French exile.

Mass socialist movements grew not only in the United States, but also in most European countries. In many other capitalist countries, struggles against dictatorships, state repression and colonisation were also marked by protests in 1968, such as the Tlatelolco massacre in Mexico City and the escalation of guerrilla warfare against the military dictatorship in Brazil.

Countries governed by Communist parties saw protests against bureaucratic and military elites too. In Eastern Europe, widespread protests escalated particularly in the Prague Spring in Czechoslovakia. In response, Soviet Union occupied Czechoslovakia. The occupation was denounced by the Italian and French Communist parties and the Communist Party of Finland, but defended by the Portuguese Communist Party secretary-general Álvaro Cunhal the Communist Party of Luxembourg and conservative factions of the Communist Party of Greece.

In the Chinese Cultural Revolution, a socio-political youth movement mobilised against "bourgeois" elements which were seen to be infiltrating the government and society at large, aiming to restore capitalism. This movement motivated Maoism-inspired movements around the world in the context of the Sino-Soviet split.

Late 20th century 

In the 1960s, a socialist tendency within the Latin American Catholic church appeared and was known as liberation theology It motivated the Colombian priest Camilo Torres Restrepo to enter the ELN guerrilla. In Chile, Salvador Allende, a physician and candidate for the Socialist Party of Chile, was elected president in 1970. In 1973, his government was ousted by the United States-backed military dictatorship of Augusto Pinochet, which lasted until the late 1980s. In Jamaica, the democratic socialist Michael Manley served as the fourth Prime Minister of Jamaica from 1972 to 1980 and from 1989 to 1992. According to opinion polls, he remains one of Jamaica's most popular Prime Ministers since independence. The Nicaraguan Revolution encompassed the rising opposition to the Somoza dictatorship in the 1960s and 1970s, the campaign led by the Sandinista National Liberation Front (FSLN) to violently oust the dictatorship in 1978–1979, the subsequent efforts of the FSLN to govern Nicaragua from 1979 until 1990 and the socialist measures which included wide-scale agrarian reform and educational programs. The People's Revolutionary Government was proclaimed on 13 March 1979 in Grenada which was overthrown by armed forces of the United States in 1983. The Salvadoran Civil War (1979–1992) was a conflict between the military-led government of El Salvador and the Farabundo Martí National Liberation Front (FMLN), a coalition or umbrella organisation of five socialist guerrilla groups. A coup on 15 October 1979 led to the killings of anti-coup protesters by the government as well as anti-disorder protesters by the guerrillas, and is widely seen as the tipping point towards the civil war.

In 1982, the newly elected French socialist government of François Mitterrand nationalised parts of a few key industries, including banks and insurance companies. Eurocommunism was a trend in the 1970s and 1980s in various Western European Communist parties to develop a theory and practice of social transformation that was more relevant for a Western European country and less aligned to the influence or control of the Communist Party of the Soviet Union. Outside Western Europe, it is sometimes called neocommunism.

Some Communist parties with strong popular support, notably the Italian Communist Party (PCI) and the Communist Party of Spain (PCE). adopted Eurocommunism most enthusiastically and the Communist Party of Finland was dominated by Eurocommunists. The French Communist Party (PCF) and many smaller parties strongly opposed Eurocommunism and stayed aligned with the Communist Party of the Soviet Union until the end of the Soviet Union. Also emerging from the Communist movement but moving in a more left-wing direction, in Italy Autonomia Operaia was particularly active from 1976 to 1978; it took an important role in the autonomist movement in the 1970s, alongside earlier organisations such as Potere Operaio (created after May 1968) and Lotta Continua, promoting a radical form of socialism based on working class self-activity rather than vanguard parties and state planning.

Until its 1976 Geneva Congress, the Socialist International (SI) had few members outside Europe and no formal involvement with Latin America. In the late 1970s and in the 1980s, the SI had extensive contacts and discussion with the two powers of the Cold War, the United States and the Soviet Union, about east–west relations and arms control, and admitted as member parties the Nicaraguan FSLN, the left-wing Puerto Rican Independence Party, as well as former Communist parties such as the Democratic Party of the Left of Italy and the Front for the Liberation of Mozambique (FRELIMO). The SI aided social democratic parties in re-establishing themselves when dictatorship gave way to democracy in Portugal (1974) and Spain (1975).

After Mao Zedong's death in 1976 and the arrest of the faction known as the Gang of Four, who were blamed for the excesses of the Cultural Revolution, Deng Xiaoping took power and led the People's Republic of China to significant economic reforms. The Chinese Communist Party (CCP) loosened governmental control over citizens' personal lives and the communes were disbanded in favour of private land leases, thus China's transition from a planned economy to a mixed economy named as "socialism with Chinese characteristics" which maintained state ownership rights over land, state or cooperative ownership of much of the heavy industrial and manufacturing sectors and state influence in the banking and financial sectors. China adopted its current constitution on 4 December 1982. Chinese Communist Party General Secretary Jiang Zemin, Premiers Li Peng and Zhu Rongji led the nation in the 1990s. Under their administration, China sustained an average annual gross domestic product growth rate of 11.2%. At the Sixth National Congress of the Communist Party of Vietnam in December 1986, reformist politicians replaced the "old guard" government with new leadership. The reformers were led by 71-year-old Nguyen Van Linh, who became the party's new general secretary.

The Soviet Union experienced continued increases in mortality rate (particularly among men) as far back as 1965. Mikhail Gorbachev wished to move the Soviet Union towards of Nordic-style social democracy, calling it "a socialist beacon for all mankind". Prior to its dissolution in 1991, the economy of the Soviet Union was by some measures the second largest in the world after the United States. This economy was beset by economic stagnation, an inflationary spiral, shortages of consumer goods, and fiscal mismanagement. With the collapse of the Soviet Union, the economic integration of the Soviet republics was dissolved and overall industrial activity declined substantially.

A lasting legacy of Communism in Soviet Union remains in the physical infrastructure created during decades of combined industrial production practices, and widespread environmental destruction. The transition to capitalist market economies in the former Soviet Union and Eastern Bloc was accompanied by Washington Consensus-inspired "shock therapy", advocated by Western institutions and economists with the intent to replace state socialism with capitalism and integrate these countries into the capitalist western world. Following a transition to free-market capitalism there has been a steep fall in the standard of living. Post-Communist Russia experienced rising economic inequality and poverty a surge in excess mortality amongst men, and a decline in life expectancy, which was accompanied by the entrenchment of a newly established business oligarchy. By contrast, the Central European states of the former Eastern Bloc–Poland, Hungary, the Czech Republic and Slovakia–showed healthy increases in life expectancy from the 1990s onward, compared to nearly thirty years of stagnation under socialism. Bulgaria and Romania followed this trend after the introduction of more serious economic reforms in the late 1990s. The average post-Communist country had returned to 1989 levels of per-capita GDP by 2005, and as of 2015, some countries were still behind that. These economic developments led to increased nationalist sentiment and nostalgia for the Communist era.

Many social democratic parties, particularly after the Cold War, adopted neoliberal market policies including privatisation, deregulation and financialisation. They abandoned their pursuit of moderate socialism in favour of economic liberalism. By the 1980s, with the rise of conservative neoliberal politicians such as Ronald Reagan in the United States, Margaret Thatcher in Britain, Brian Mulroney in Canada and Augusto Pinochet in Chile, the Western welfare state was dismantled from within, but state support for the corporate sector was maintained. In the United Kingdom, Labour Party leader Neil Kinnock expelled some Trotskyist members and refused to support the 1984–1985 miners' strike over pit closures. In 1989, the 18th Congress of the SI adopted a new Declaration of Principles, stating: "Democratic socialism is an international movement for freedom, social justice, and solidarity. Its goal is to achieve a peaceful world where these basic values can be enhanced and where each individual can live a meaningful life with the full development of his or her personality and talents, and with the guarantee of human and civil rights in a democratic framework of society."

In the 1990s, the British Labour Party under Tony Blair enacted policies based on the free-market economy to deliver public services via the private finance initiative. Influential in these policies was the idea of a Third Way between Old Left state socialism and New Right market capitalism, and a re-evaluation of welfare state policies. In 1995, the Labour Party re-defined its stance on socialism by re-wording Clause IV of its constitution, defining socialism in ethical terms and removing all references to public, direct worker or municipal ownership of the means of production. The Labour Party stated: "The Labour Party is a democratic socialist party. It believes that, by the strength of our common endeavour we achieve more than we achieve alone, so as to create, for each of us, the means to realise our true potential, and, for all of us, a community in which power, wealth, and opportunity are in the hands of the many, not the few."

Early 21st century 

In 1990, the São Paulo Forum was launched by the Workers' Party (Brazil), linking left-wing socialist parties in Latin America. Its members were associated with the Pink tide of left-wing governments on the continent in the early 21st century. Member parties ruling countries included the Front for Victory in Argentina, the PAIS Alliance in Ecuador, Farabundo Martí National Liberation Front in El Salvador, Peru Wins in Peru, and the United Socialist Party of Venezuela, whose leader Hugo Chávez initiated what he called "Socialism of the 21st century".

Many mainstream democratic socialist and social democratic parties continued to drift right-wards. On the right of the socialist movement, the Progressive Alliance was founded in 2013 by current or former members of the Socialist International. The organisation states the aim of becoming the global network of "the progressive, democratic, social-democratic, socialist and labour movement". Mainstream social democratic and socialist parties are also networked in Europe in the Party of European Socialists formed in 1992. Many of these parties lost large parts of their electoral base in the early 21st century. This phenomenon is known as Pasokification from the Greek party PASOK, which saw a declining share of the vote in national elections—from 43.9% in 2009 to 13.2% in May 2012, to 12.3% in June 2012 and 4.7% in 2015—due to its poor handling of the Greek government-debt crisis and implementation of harsh austerity measures.

In Europe, the share of votes for such socialist parties was at its 70-year lowest in 2015. For example, the Socialist Party, after winning the 2012 French presidential election, rapidly lost its vote share, the Social Democratic Party of Germany's fortunes declined rapidly from 2005 to 2019, and outside Europe the Israeli Labor Party fell from being the dominant force in Israeli politics to 4.43% of the vote in the April 2019 Israeli legislative election, and the Peruvian Aprista Party went from ruling party in 2011 to a minor party. The decline of these mainstream parties opened space for more radical and populist left parties in some countries, such as Spain's Podemos, Greece's Syriza (in government, 2015–19), Germany's Die Linke, and France's La France Insoumise. In other countries, left-wing revivals have taken place within mainstream democratic socialist and centrist parties, as with Jeremy Corbyn in the United Kingdom and Bernie Sanders in the United States. Few of these radical left parties have won national government in Europe, while some more mainstream socialist parties have managed to, such as Portugal's Socialist Party.

Social and political theory 

Early socialist thought took influences from a diverse range of philosophies such as civic republicanism, Enlightenment rationalism, romanticism, forms of materialism, Christianity (both Catholic and Protestant), natural law and natural rights theory, utilitarianism and liberal political economy. Another philosophical basis for a great deal of early socialism was the emergence of positivism during the European Enlightenment. Positivism held that both the natural and social worlds could be understood through scientific knowledge and be analysed using scientific methods. This core outlook influenced early social scientists and different types of socialists ranging from anarchists like Peter Kropotkin to technocrats like Saint Simon.

The fundamental objective of socialism is to attain an advanced level of material production and therefore greater productivity, efficiency and rationality as compared to capitalism and all previous systems, under the view that an expansion of human productive capability is the basis for the extension of freedom and equality in society. Many forms of socialist theory hold that human behaviour is largely shaped by the social environment. In particular, socialism holds that social mores, values, cultural traits and economic practices are social creations and not the result of an immutable natural law. The object of their critique is thus not human avarice or human consciousness, but the material conditions and man-made social systems (i.e. the economic structure of society) that gives rise to observed social problems and inefficiencies. Bertrand Russell, often considered to be the father of analytic philosophy, identified as a socialist. Russell opposed the class struggle aspects of Marxism, viewing socialism solely as an adjustment of economic relations to accommodate modern machine production to benefit all of humanity through the progressive reduction of necessary work time.

Socialists view creativity as an essential aspect of human nature and define freedom as a state of being where individuals are able to express their creativity unhindered by constraints of both material scarcity and coercive social institutions. The socialist concept of individuality is intertwined with the concept of individual creative expression. Karl Marx believed that expansion of the productive forces and technology was the basis for the expansion of human freedom and that socialism, being a system that is consistent with modern developments in technology, would enable the flourishing of "free individualities" through the progressive reduction of necessary labour time. The reduction of necessary labour time to a minimum would grant individuals the opportunity to pursue the development of their true individuality and creativity.

Criticism of capitalism 

Socialists argue that the accumulation of capital generates waste through externalities that require costly corrective regulatory measures. They also point out that this process generates wasteful industries and practices that exist only to generate sufficient demand for products such as high-pressure advertisement to be sold at a profit, thereby creating rather than satisfying economic demand. Socialists argue that capitalism consists of irrational activity, such as the purchasing of commodities only to sell at a later time when their price appreciates, rather than for consumption, even if the commodity cannot be sold at a profit to individuals in need and therefore a crucial criticism often made by socialists is that "making money", or accumulation of capital, does not correspond to the satisfaction of demand (the production of use-values). The fundamental criterion for economic activity in capitalism is the accumulation of capital for reinvestment in production, but this spurs the development of new, non-productive industries that do not produce use-value and only exist to keep the accumulation process afloat (otherwise the system goes into crisis), such as the spread of the financial industry, contributing to the formation of economic bubbles.

Socialists view private property relations as limiting the potential of productive forces in the economy. According to socialists, private property becomes obsolete when it concentrates into centralised, socialised institutions based on private appropriation of revenue—but based on cooperative work and internal planning in allocation of inputs—until the role of the capitalist becomes redundant. With no need for capital accumulation and a class of owners, private property in the means of production is perceived as being an outdated form of economic organisation that should be replaced by a free association of individuals based on public or common ownership of these socialised assets. Private ownership imposes constraints on planning, leading to uncoordinated economic decisions that result in business fluctuations, unemployment and a tremendous waste of material resources during crisis of overproduction.

Excessive disparities in income distribution lead to social instability and require costly corrective measures in the form of redistributive taxation, which incurs heavy administrative costs while weakening the incentive to work, inviting dishonesty and increasing the likelihood of tax evasion while (the corrective measures) reduce the overall efficiency of the market economy. These corrective policies limit the incentive system of the market by providing things such as minimum wages, unemployment insurance, taxing profits and reducing the reserve army of labour, resulting in reduced incentives for capitalists to invest in more production. In essence, social welfare policies cripple capitalism and its incentive system and are thus unsustainable in the long-run. Marxists argue that the establishment of a socialist mode of production is the only way to overcome these deficiencies. Socialists and specifically Marxian socialists argue that the inherent conflict of interests between the working class and capital prevent optimal use of available human resources and leads to contradictory interest groups (labour and business) striving to influence the state to intervene in the economy in their favour at the expense of overall economic efficiency. Early socialists (utopian socialists and Ricardian socialists) criticised capitalism for concentrating power and wealth within a small segment of society. In addition, they complained that capitalism does not use available technology and resources to their maximum potential in the interests of the public.

Marxism 

Karl Marx and Friedrich Engels argued that socialism would emerge from historical necessity as capitalism rendered itself obsolete and unsustainable from increasing internal contradictions emerging from the development of the productive forces and technology. It was these advances in the productive forces combined with the old social relations of production of capitalism that would generate contradictions, leading to working-class consciousness.

Marx and Engels held the view that the consciousness of those who earn a wage or salary (the working class in the broadest Marxist sense) would be moulded by their conditions of wage slavery, leading to a tendency to seek their freedom or emancipation by overthrowing ownership of the means of production by capitalists and consequently, overthrowing the state that upheld this economic order. For Marx and Engels, conditions determine consciousness and ending the role of the capitalist class leads eventually to a classless society in which the state would wither away.

Marx and Engels used the terms socialism and communism interchangeably, but many later Marxists defined socialism as a specific historical phase that would displace capitalism and precede communism.

The major characteristics of socialism (particularly as conceived by Marx and Engels after the Paris Commune of 1871) are that the proletariat would control the means of production through a workers' state erected by the workers in their interests. Economic activity would still be organised through the use of incentive systems and social classes would still exist, but to a lesser and diminishing extent than under capitalism.

For orthodox Marxists, socialism is the lower stage of communism based on the principle of "from each according to his ability, to each according to his contribution" while upper stage communism is based on the principle of "from each according to his ability, to each according to his need", the upper stage becoming possible only after the socialist stage further develops economic efficiency and the automation of production has led to a superabundance of goods and services. Marx argued that the material productive forces (in industry and commerce) brought into existence by capitalism predicated a cooperative society since production had become a mass social, collective activity of the working class to create commodities but with private ownership (the relations of production or property relations). This conflict between collective effort in large factories and private ownership would bring about a conscious desire in the working class to establish collective ownership commensurate with the collective efforts their daily experience.

Role of the state 

Socialists have taken different perspectives on the state and the role it should play in revolutionary struggles, in constructing socialism and within an established socialist economy.

In the 19th century, the philosophy of state socialism was first explicitly expounded by the German political philosopher Ferdinand Lassalle. In contrast to Karl Marx's perspective of the state, Lassalle rejected the concept of the state as a class-based power structure whose main function was to preserve existing class structures. Lassalle also rejected the Marxist view that the state was destined to "wither away". Lassalle considered the state to be an entity independent of class allegiances and an instrument of justice that would therefore be essential for achieving socialism.

Preceding the Bolshevik-led revolution in Russia, many socialists including reformists, orthodox Marxist currents such as council communism, anarchists and libertarian socialists criticised the idea of using the state to conduct central planning and own the means of production as a way to establish socialism. Following the victory of Leninism in Russia, the idea of "state socialism" spread rapidly throughout the socialist movement and eventually state socialism came to be identified with the Soviet economic model.

Joseph Schumpeter rejected the association of socialism and social ownership with state ownership over the means of production because the state as it exists in its current form is a product of capitalist society and cannot be transplanted to a different institutional framework. Schumpeter argued that there would be different institutions within socialism than those that exist within modern capitalism, just as feudalism had its own distinct and unique institutional forms. The state, along with concepts like property and taxation, were concepts exclusive to commercial society (capitalism) and attempting to place them within the context of a future socialist society would amount to a distortion of these concepts by using them out of context.

Utopian versus scientific 

Utopian socialism is a term used to define the first currents of modern socialist thought as exemplified by the work of Henri de Saint-Simon, Charles Fourier and Robert Owen which inspired Karl Marx and other early socialists. Visions of imaginary ideal societies, which competed with revolutionary social democratic movements, were viewed as not being grounded in the material conditions of society and as reactionary. Although it is technically possible for any set of ideas or any person living at any time in history to be a utopian socialist, the term is most often applied to those socialists who lived in the first quarter of the 19th century who were ascribed the label "utopian" by later socialists as a negative term in order to imply naivete and dismiss their ideas as fanciful or unrealistic.

Religious sects whose members live communally such as the Hutterites are not usually called "utopian socialists", although their way of living is a prime example. They have been categorised as religious socialists by some. Similarly, modern intentional communities based on socialist ideas could also be categorised as "utopian socialist". For Marxists, the development of capitalism in Western Europe provided a material basis for the possibility of bringing about socialism because according to The Communist Manifesto "[w]hat the bourgeoisie produces above all is its own grave diggers", namely the working class, which must become conscious of the historical objectives set it by society.

Reform versus revolution 

Revolutionary socialists believe that a social revolution is necessary to effect structural changes to the socioeconomic structure of society. Among revolutionary socialists there are differences in strategy, theory and the definition of revolution. Orthodox Marxists and left communists take an impossibilist stance, believing that revolution should be spontaneous as a result of contradictions in society due to technological changes in the productive forces. Lenin theorised that under capitalism the workers cannot achieve class consciousness beyond organising into trade unions and making demands of the capitalists. Therefore, Leninists argue that it is historically necessary for a vanguard of class conscious revolutionaries to take a central role in coordinating the social revolution to overthrow the capitalist state and eventually the institution of the state altogether. Revolution is not necessarily defined by revolutionary socialists as violent insurrection, but as a complete dismantling and rapid transformation of all areas of class society led by the majority of the masses: the working class.

Reformism is generally associated with social democracy and gradualist democratic socialism. Reformism is the belief that socialists should stand in parliamentary elections within capitalist society and if elected use the machinery of government to pass political and social reforms for the purposes of ameliorating the instabilities and inequities of capitalism. Within socialism, reformism is used in two different ways. One has no intention of bringing about socialism or fundamental economic change to society and is used to oppose such structural changes. The other is based on the assumption that while reforms are not socialist in themselves, they can help rally supporters to the cause of revolution by popularizing the cause of socialism to the working class.

The debate on the ability for social democratic reformism to lead to a socialist transformation of society is over a century old. Reformism is criticized for being paradoxical as it seeks to overcome the existing economic system of capitalism while trying to improve the conditions of capitalism, thereby making it appear more tolerable to society. According to Rosa Luxemburg, capitalism is not overthrown, "but is on the contrary strengthened by the development of social reforms". In a similar vein, Stan Parker of the Socialist Party of Great Britain argues that reforms are a diversion of energy for socialists and are limited because they must adhere to the logic of capitalism. French social theorist Andre Gorz criticized reformism by advocating a third alternative to reformism and social revolution that he called "non-reformist reforms", specifically focused on structural changes to capitalism as opposed to reforms to improve living conditions within capitalism or to prop it up through economic interventions.

Economics 

Socialist economics starts from the premise that "individuals do not live or work in isolation but live in cooperation with one another. Furthermore, everything that people produce is in some sense a social product, and everyone who contributes to the production of a good is entitled to a share in it. Society as whole, therefore, should own or at least control property for the benefit of all its members".

The original conception of socialism was an economic system whereby production was organised in a way to directly produce goods and services for their utility (or use-value in classical and Marxian economics), with the direct allocation of resources in terms of physical units as opposed to financial calculation and the economic laws of capitalism (see law of value), often entailing the end of capitalistic economic categories such as rent, interest, profit and money. In a fully developed socialist economy, production and balancing factor inputs with outputs becomes a technical process to be undertaken by engineers.

Market socialism refers to an array of different economic theories and systems that use the market mechanism to organise production and to allocate factor inputs among socially owned enterprises, with the economic surplus (profits) accruing to society in a social dividend as opposed to private capital owners. Variations of market socialism include libertarian proposals such as mutualism, based on classical economics, and neoclassical economic models such as the Lange Model. Some economists, such as Joseph Stiglitz, Mancur Olson, and others not specifically advancing anti-socialists positions have shown that prevailing economic models upon which such democratic or market socialism models might be based have logical flaws or unworkable presuppositions.

The ownership of the means of production can be based on direct ownership by the users of the productive property through worker cooperative; or commonly owned by all of society with management and control delegated to those who operate/use the means of production; or public ownership by a state apparatus. Public ownership may refer to the creation of state-owned enterprises, nationalisation, municipalisation or autonomous collective institutions. Some socialists feel that in a socialist economy, at least the "commanding heights" of the economy must be publicly owned. Economic liberals and right libertarians view private ownership of the means of production and the market exchange as natural entities or moral rights which are central to their conceptions of freedom and liberty and view the economic dynamics of capitalism as immutable and absolute, therefore they perceive public ownership of the means of production, cooperatives and economic planning as infringements upon liberty.

Management and control over the activities of enterprises are based on self-management and self-governance, with equal power-relations in the workplace to maximise occupational autonomy. A socialist form of organisation would eliminate controlling hierarchies so that only a hierarchy based on technical knowledge in the workplace remains. Every member would have decision-making power in the firm and would be able to participate in establishing its overall policy objectives. The policies/goals would be carried out by the technical specialists that form the coordinating hierarchy of the firm, who would establish plans or directives for the work community to accomplish these goals.

The role and use of money in a hypothetical socialist economy is a contested issue. Nineteenth century socialists including Karl Marx, Robert Owen, Pierre-Joseph Proudhon and John Stuart Mill advocated various forms of labour vouchers or labour credits, which like money would be used to acquire articles of consumption, but unlike money they are unable to become capital and would not be used to allocate resources within the production process. Bolshevik revolutionary Leon Trotsky argued that money could not be arbitrarily abolished following a socialist revolution. Money had to exhaust its "historic mission", meaning it would have to be used until its function became redundant, eventually being transformed into bookkeeping receipts for statisticians and only in the more distant future would money not be required for even that role.

Planned economy 

A planned economy is a type of economy consisting of a mixture of public ownership of the means of production and the coordination of production and distribution through economic planning. A planned economy can be either decentralised or centralised. Enrico Barone provided a comprehensive theoretical framework for a planned socialist economy. In his model, assuming perfect computation techniques, simultaneous equations relating inputs and outputs to ratios of equivalence would provide appropriate valuations in order to balance supply and demand.

The most prominent example of a planned economy was the economic system of the Soviet Union and as such the centralised-planned economic model is usually associated with the communist states of the 20th century, where it was combined with a single-party political system. In a centrally planned economy, decisions regarding the quantity of goods and services to be produced are planned in advance by a planning agency (see also the analysis of Soviet-type economic planning). The economic systems of the Soviet Union and the Eastern Bloc are further classified as "command economies", which are defined as systems where economic coordination is undertaken by commands, directives and production targets. Studies by economists of various political persuasions on the actual functioning of the Soviet economy indicate that it was not actually a planned economy. Instead of conscious planning, the Soviet economy was based on a process whereby the plan was modified by localised agents and the original plans went largely unfulfilled. Planning agencies, ministries and enterprises all adapted and bargained with each other during the formulation of the plan as opposed to following a plan passed down from a higher authority, leading some economists to suggest that planning did not actually take place within the Soviet economy and that a better description would be an "administered" or "managed" economy.

Although central planning was largely supported by Marxist–Leninists, some factions within the Soviet Union before the rise of Stalinism held positions contrary to central planning. Leon Trotsky rejected central planning in favour of decentralised planning. He argued that central planners, regardless of their intellectual capacity, would be unable to coordinate effectively all economic activity within an economy because they operated without the input and tacit knowledge embodied by the participation of the millions of people in the economy. As a result, central planners would be unable to respond to local economic conditions. State socialism is unfeasible in this view because information cannot be aggregated by a central body and effectively used to formulate a plan for an entire economy, because doing so would result in distorted or absent price signals.

Self-managed economy 

A self-managed, decentralised economy is based on autonomous self-regulating economic units and a decentralised mechanism of resource allocation and decision-making. This model has found support in notable classical and neoclassical economists including Alfred Marshall, John Stuart Mill and Jaroslav Vanek. There are numerous variations of self-management, including labour-managed firms and worker-managed firms. The goals of self-management are to eliminate exploitation and reduce alienation. Guild socialism is a political movement advocating workers' control of industry through the medium of trade-related guilds "in an implied contractual relationship with the public". It originated in the United Kingdom and was at its most influential in the first quarter of the 20th century. It was strongly associated with G. D. H. Cole and influenced by the ideas of William Morris.

One such system is the cooperative economy, a largely free market economy in which workers manage the firms and democratically determine remuneration levels and labour divisions. Productive resources would be legally owned by the cooperative and rented to the workers, who would enjoy usufruct rights. Another form of decentralised planning is the use of cybernetics, or the use of computers to manage the allocation of economic inputs. The socialist-run government of Salvador Allende in Chile experimented with Project Cybersyn, a real-time information bridge between the government, state enterprises and consumers. Another, more recent variant is participatory economics, wherein the economy is planned by decentralised councils of workers and consumers. Workers would be remunerated solely according to effort and sacrifice, so that those engaged in dangerous, uncomfortable and strenuous work would receive the highest incomes and could thereby work less. A contemporary model for a self-managed, non-market socialism is Pat Devine's model of negotiated coordination. Negotiated coordination is based upon social ownership by those affected by the use of the assets involved, with decisions made by those at the most localised level of production.

Michel Bauwens identifies the emergence of the open software movement and peer-to-peer production as a new alternative mode of production to the capitalist economy and centrally planned economy that is based on collaborative self-management, common ownership of resources and the production of use-values through the free cooperation of producers who have access to distributed capital.

Anarcho-communism is a theory of anarchism which advocates the abolition of the state, private property and capitalism in favour of common ownership of the means of production. Anarcho-syndicalism was practised in Catalonia and other places in the Spanish Revolution during the Spanish Civil War. Sam Dolgoff estimated that about eight million people participated directly or at least indirectly in the Spanish Revolution.

The economy of the former Socialist Federal Republic of Yugoslavia established a system based on market-based allocation, social ownership of the means of production and self-management within firms. This system substituted Yugoslavia's Soviet-type central planning with a decentralised, self-managed system after reforms in 1953.

The Marxian economist Richard D. Wolff argues that "re-organising production so that workers become collectively self-directed at their work-sites" not only moves society beyond both capitalism and state socialism of the last century, but would also mark another milestone in human history, similar to earlier transitions out of slavery and feudalism. As an example, Wolff claims that Mondragon is "a stunningly successful alternative to the capitalist organisation of production".

State-directed economy 

State socialism can be used to classify any variety of socialist philosophies that advocates the ownership of the means of production by the state apparatus, either as a transitional stage between capitalism and socialism, or as an end-goal in itself. Typically, it refers to a form of technocratic management, whereby technical specialists administer or manage economic enterprises on behalf of society and the public interest instead of workers' councils or workplace democracy.

A state-directed economy may refer to a type of mixed economy consisting of public ownership over large industries, as promoted by various Social democratic political parties during the 20th century. This ideology influenced the policies of the British Labour Party during Clement Attlee's administration. In the biography of the 1945 United Kingdom Labour Party Prime Minister Clement Attlee, Francis Beckett states: "[T]he government ... wanted what would become known as a mixed economy."

Nationalisation in the United Kingdom was achieved through compulsory purchase of the industry (i.e. with compensation). British Aerospace was a combination of major aircraft companies British Aircraft Corporation, Hawker Siddeley and others. British Shipbuilders was a combination of the major shipbuilding companies including Cammell Laird, Govan Shipbuilders, Swan Hunter and Yarrow Shipbuilders, whereas the nationalisation of the coal mines in 1947 created a coal board charged with running the coal industry commercially so as to be able to meet the interest payable on the bonds which the former mine owners' shares had been converted into.

Market socialism 

Market socialism consists of publicly owned or cooperatively owned enterprises operating in a market economy. It is a system that uses the market and monetary prices for the allocation and accounting of the means of production, thereby retaining the process of capital accumulation. The profit generated would be used to directly remunerate employees, collectively sustain the enterprise or finance public institutions. In state-oriented forms of market socialism, in which state enterprises attempt to maximise profit, the profits can be used to fund government programs and services through a social dividend, eliminating or greatly diminishing the need for various forms of taxation that exist in capitalist systems. Neoclassical economist Léon Walras believed that a socialist economy based on state ownership of land and natural resources would provide a means of public finance to make income taxes unnecessary. Yugoslavia implemented a market socialist economy based on cooperatives and worker self-management.

Mutualism is an economic theory and anarchist school of thought that advocates a society where each person might possess a means of production, either individually or collectively, with trade representing equivalent amounts of labour in the free market. Integral to the scheme was the establishment of a mutual-credit bank that would lend to producers at a minimal interest rate, just high enough to cover administration. Mutualism is based on a labour theory of value that holds that when labour or its product is sold, in exchange it ought to receive goods or services embodying "the amount of labour necessary to produce an article of exactly similar and equal utility".

The current economic system in China is formally referred to as a socialist market economy with Chinese characteristics. It combines a large state sector that comprises the commanding heights of the economy, which are guaranteed their public ownership status by law, with a private sector mainly engaged in commodity production and light industry responsible from anywhere between 33% to over 70% of GDP generated in 2005. Although there has been a rapid expansion of private-sector activity since the 1980s, privatisation of state assets was virtually halted and were partially reversed in 2005. The current Chinese economy consists of 150 corporatised state-owned enterprises that report directly to China's central government. By 2008, these state-owned corporations had become increasingly dynamic and generated large increases in revenue for the state, resulting in a state-sector led recovery during the 2009 financial crises while accounting for most of China's economic growth. The Chinese economic model is widely cited as a contemporary form of state capitalism, the major difference between Western capitalism and the Chinese model being the degree of state-ownership of shares in publicly listed corporations. The Socialist Republic of Vietnam has adopted a similar model after the Doi Moi economic renovation but slightly differs from the Chinese model in that the Vietnamese government retains firm control over the state sector and strategic industries, but allows for private-sector activity in commodity production.

Politics 

While major socialist political movements include anarchism, communism, the labour movement, Marxism, social democracy, and syndicalism, independent socialist theorists, utopian socialist authors, and academic supporters of socialism may not be represented in these movements. Some political groups have called themselves socialist while holding views that some consider antithetical to socialism. Socialist has been used by the political right as an epithet, including against individuals who do not consider themselves to be socialists and against policies that are not considered socialist by their proponents. While there are many variations of socialism, and there is no single definition encapsulating all of socialism, there have been common elements identified by scholars.

In his Dictionary of Socialism (1924), Angelo S. Rappoport analysed forty definitions of socialism to conclude that common elements of socialism include general criticism of the social effects of private ownership and control of capital—as being the cause of poverty, low wages, unemployment, economic and social inequality and a lack of economic security; a general view that the solution to these problems is a form of collective control over the means of production, distribution and exchange (the degree and means of control vary amongst socialist movements); an agreement that the outcome of this collective control should be a society based upon social justice, including social equality, economic protection of people and should provide a more satisfying life for most people.

In The Concepts of Socialism (1975), Bhikhu Parekh identifies four core principles of socialism and particularly socialist society, namely sociality, social responsibility, cooperation and planning. In his study Ideologies and Political Theory (1996), Michael Freeden states that all socialists share five themes: the first is that socialism posits that society is more than a mere collection of individuals; second, that it considers human welfare a desirable objective; third, that it considers humans by nature to be active and productive; fourth, it holds the belief of human equality; and fifth, that history is progressive and will create positive change on the condition that humans work to achieve such change.

Anarchism 

Anarchism advocates stateless societies often defined as self-governed voluntary institutions, but that several authors have defined as more specific institutions based on non-hierarchical free associations. While anarchism holds the state to be undesirable, unnecessary or harmful, it is not the central aspect. Anarchism entails opposing authority or hierarchical organisation in the conduct of human relations, including the state system. Mutualists support market socialism, collectivist anarchists favour workers cooperatives and salaries based on the amount of time contributed to production, anarcho-communists advocate a direct transition from capitalism to libertarian communism and a gift economy and anarcho-syndicalists prefer workers' direct action and the general strike.

The authoritarian–libertarian struggles and disputes within the socialist movement go back to the First International and the expulsion in 1872 of the anarchists, who went on to lead the Anti-authoritarian International and then founded their own libertarian international, the Anarchist St. Imier International. In 1888, the individualist anarchist Benjamin Tucker, who proclaimed himself to be an anarchistic socialist and libertarian socialist in opposition to the authoritarian state socialism and the compulsory communism, included the full text of a "Socialistic Letter" by Ernest Lesigne in his essay on "State Socialism and Anarchism". According to Lesigne, there are two types of socialism: "One is dictatorial, the other libertarian". Tucker's two socialisms were the authoritarian state socialism which he associated to the Marxist school and the libertarian anarchist socialism, or simply anarchism, that he advocated. Tucker noted that the fact that the authoritarian "State Socialism has overshadowed other forms of Socialism gives it no right to a monopoly of the Socialistic idea". According to Tucker, what those two schools of socialism had in common was the labor theory of value and the ends, by which anarchism pursued different means.

According to anarchists such as the authors of An Anarchist FAQ, anarchism is one of the many traditions of socialism. For anarchists and other anti-authoritarian socialists, socialism "can only mean a classless and anti-authoritarian (i.e. libertarian) society in which people manage their own affairs, either as individuals or as part of a group (depending on the situation). In other words, it implies self-management in all aspects of life", including at the workplace. Michael Newman includes anarchism as one of many socialist traditions. Peter Marshall argues that "[i]n general anarchism is closer to socialism than liberalism. ... Anarchism finds itself largely in the socialist camp, but it also has outriders in liberalism. It cannot be reduced to socialism, and is best seen as a separate and distinctive doctrine."

Democratic socialism and social democracy 

Democratic socialism represents any socialist movement that seeks to establish an economy based on economic democracy by and for the working class. Democratic socialism is difficult to define and groups of scholars have radically different definitions for the term. Some definitions simply refer to all forms of socialism that follow an electoral, reformist or evolutionary path to socialism rather than a revolutionary one. According to Christopher Pierson, "[i]f the contrast which 1989 highlights is not that between socialism in the East and liberal democracy in the West, the latter must be recognised to have been shaped, reformed and compromised by a century of social democratic pressure". Pierson further claims that "social democratic and socialist parties within the constitutional arena in the West have almost always been involved in a politics of compromise with existing capitalist institutions (to whatever far distant prize its eyes might from time to time have been lifted)". For Pierson, "if advocates of the death of socialism accept that social democrats belong within the socialist camp, as I think they must, then the contrast between socialism (in all its variants) and liberal democracy must collapse. For actually existing liberal democracy is, in substantial part, a product of socialist (social democratic) forces".

Social democracy is a socialist tradition of political thought. Many social democrats refer to themselves as socialists or democratic socialists and some such as Tony Blair employ these terms interchangeably. Others found "clear differences" between the three terms and prefer to describe their own political beliefs by using the term social democracy. The two main directions were to establish democratic socialism or to build first a welfare state within the capitalist system. The first variant advances democratic socialism through reformist and gradualist methods. In the second variant, social democracy is a policy regime involving a welfare state, collective bargaining schemes, support for publicly financed public services and a mixed economy. It is often used in this manner to refer to Western and Northern Europe during the later half of the 20th century. It was described by Jerry Mander as "hybrid economics", an active collaboration of capitalist and socialist visions. Numerous studies and surveys indicate that people tend to live happier and healthier lives in social democratic societies rather than neoliberal ones.

Social democrats advocate a peaceful, evolutionary transition of the economy to socialism through progressive social reform. It asserts that the only acceptable constitutional form of government is representative democracy under the rule of law. It promotes extending democratic decision-making beyond political democracy to include economic democracy to guarantee employees and other economic stakeholders sufficient rights of co-determination. It supports a mixed economy that opposes inequality, poverty and oppression while rejecting both a totally unregulated market economy or a fully planned economy. Common social democratic policies include universal social rights and universally accessible public services such as education, health care, workers' compensation and other services, including child care and elder care. Social democracy supports the trade union labour movement and supports collective bargaining rights for workers. Most social democratic parties are affiliated with the Socialist International.

Modern democratic socialism is a broad political movement that seeks to promote the ideals of socialism within the context of a democratic system. Some democratic socialists support social democracy as a temporary measure to reform the current system while others reject reformism in favour of more revolutionary methods. Modern social democracy emphasises a program of gradual legislative modification of capitalism in order to make it more equitable and humane while the theoretical end goal of building a socialist society is relegated to the indefinite future. According to Sheri Berman, Marxism is loosely held to be valuable for its emphasis on changing the world for a more just, better future.

The two movements are widely similar both in terminology and in ideology, although there are a few key differences. The major difference between social democracy and democratic socialism is the object of their politics in that contemporary social democrats support a welfare state and unemployment insurance as well as other practical, progressive reforms of capitalism and are more concerned to administrate and humanise it. On the other hand, democratic socialists seek to replace capitalism with a socialist economic system, arguing that any attempt to humanise capitalism through regulations and welfare policies would distort the market and create economic contradictions.

Ethical and liberal socialism 

Ethical socialism appeals to socialism on ethical and moral grounds as opposed to economic, egoistic and consumeristic grounds. It emphasizes the need for a morally conscious economy based upon the principles of altruism, cooperation and social justice while opposing possessive individualism. Ethical socialism has been the official philosophy of mainstream socialist parties.

Liberal socialism incorporates liberal principles to socialism. It has been compared to post-war social democracy for its support of a mixed economy that includes both public and private capital goods. While democratic socialism and social democracy are anti-capitalist positions insofar as criticism of capitalism is linked to the private ownership of the means of production, liberal socialism identifies artificial and legalistic monopolies to be the fault of capitalism and opposes an entirely unregulated market economy. It considers both liberty and social equality to be compatible and mutually dependent.

Principles that can be described as ethical or liberal socialist have been based upon or developed by philosophers such as John Stuart Mill, Eduard Bernstein, John Dewey, Carlo Rosselli, Norberto Bobbio and Chantal Mouffe. Other important liberal socialist figures include Guido Calogero, Piero Gobetti, Leonard Trelawny Hobhouse, John Maynard Keynes and R. H. Tawney. Liberal socialism has been particularly prominent in British and Italian politics.

Leninism and precedents 

Blanquism is a conception of revolution named for Louis Auguste Blanqui. It holds that socialist revolution should be carried out by a relatively small group of highly organised and secretive conspirators. Upon seizing power, the revolutionaries introduce socialism. Rosa Luxemburg and Eduard Bernstein criticised Lenin, stating that his conception of revolution was elitist and Blanquist. Marxism–Leninism combines Marx's scientific socialist concepts and Lenin's anti-imperialism, democratic centralism and vanguardism.

Hal Draper defined socialism from above as the philosophy which employs an elite administration to run the socialist state. The other side of socialism is a more democratic socialism from below. The idea of socialism from above is much more frequently discussed in elite circles than socialism from below—even if that is the Marxist ideal—because it is more practical. Draper viewed socialism from below as being the purer, more Marxist version of socialism. According to Draper, Karl Marx and Friedrich Engels were devoutly opposed to any socialist institution that was "conducive to superstitious authoritarianism". Draper makes the argument that this division echoes the division between "reformist or revolutionary, peaceful or violent, democratic or authoritarian, etc." and further identifies six major varieties of socialism from above, among them "Philanthropism", "Elitism", "Pannism", "Communism", "Permeationism" and "Socialism-from-Outside".

According to Arthur Lipow, Marx and Engels were "the founders of modern revolutionary democratic socialism", described as a form of "socialism from below" that is "based on a mass working-class movement, fighting from below for the extension of democracy and human freedom". This type of socialism is contrasted to that of the "authoritarian, antidemocratic creed" and "the various totalitarian collectivist ideologies which claim the title of socialism" as well as "the many varieties of 'socialism from above' which have led in the twentieth century to movements and state forms in which a despotic 'new class' rules over a statified economy in the name of socialism", a division that "runs through the history of the socialist movement". Lipow identifies Bellamyism and Stalinism as two prominent authoritarian socialist currents within the history of the socialist movement.

Libertarian socialism 

Libertarian socialism, sometimes called left-libertarianism, social anarchism and socialist libertarianism, is an anti-authoritarian, anti-statist and libertarian tradition within socialism that rejects centralised state ownership and control including criticism of wage labour relationships (wage slavery) as well as the state itself. It emphasises workers' self-management and decentralised structures of political organisation. Libertarian socialism asserts that a society based on freedom and equality can be achieved through abolishing authoritarian institutions that control production. Libertarian socialists generally prefer direct democracy and federal or confederal associations such as libertarian municipalism, citizens' assemblies, trade unions and workers' councils.

Anarcho-syndicalist Gaston Leval explained:

All of this is typically done within a general call for libertarian and voluntary free associations through the identification, criticism and practical dismantling of illegitimate authority in all aspects of human life.

As part of the larger socialist movement, it seeks to distinguish itself from Bolshevism, Leninism and Marxism–Leninism as well as social democracy. Past and present political philosophies and movements commonly described as libertarian socialist include anarchism (anarcho-communism, anarcho-syndicalism, collectivist anarchism, individualist anarchism and mutualism), autonomism, Communalism, participism, libertarian Marxism (council communism and Luxemburgism), revolutionary syndicalism and utopian socialism (Fourierism).

Religious socialism 

Christian socialism is a broad concept involving an intertwining of Christian religion with socialism.

Islamic socialism is a more spiritual form of socialism. Muslim socialists believe that the teachings of the Quran and Muhammad are not only compatible with, but actively promoting the principles of equality and public ownership, drawing inspiration from the early Medina welfare state he established. Muslim socialists are more conservative than their Western contemporaries and find their roots in anti-imperialism, anti-colonialism and sometimes, if in an Arab speaking country, Arab nationalism. Islamic socialists believe in deriving legitimacy from political mandate as opposed to religious texts.

Social movements 

Socialist feminism is a branch of feminism that argues that liberation can only be achieved by working to end both economic and cultural sources of women's oppression. Marxist feminism's foundation was laid by Engels in The Origin of the Family, Private Property, and the State (1884). August Bebel's Woman under Socialism (1879), is the "single work dealing with sexuality most widely read by rank-and-file members of the Social Democratic Party of Germany (SPD)". In the late 19th and early 20th centuries, both Clara Zetkin and Eleanor Marx were against the demonisation of men and supported a proletariat revolution that would overcome as many male-female inequalities as possible. As their movement already had the most radical demands in women's equality, most Marxist leaders, including Clara Zetkin and Alexandra Kollontai, counterposed Marxism against liberal feminism rather than trying to combine them. In 1972, the Chicago Women's Liberation Union published "Socialist Feminism: A Strategy for the Women's Movement", which is believed to be the first published use of the term "socialist feminism".

Many socialists were early advocates of LGBT rights. For early socialist Charles Fourier, true freedom could only occur without suppressing passions, as the suppression of passions is not only destructive to the individual, but to society as a whole. Writing before the advent of the term "homosexuality", Fourier recognised that both men and women have a wide range of sexual needs and preferences which may change throughout their lives, including same-sex sexuality and androgénité. He argued that all sexual expressions should be enjoyed as long as people are not abused and that "affirming one's difference" can actually enhance social integration. In Oscar Wilde's The Soul of Man Under Socialism, he advocates an egalitarian society where wealth is shared by all, while warning of the dangers of social systems that crush individuality. Edward Carpenter actively campaigned for homosexual rights. His work The Intermediate Sex: A Study of Some Transitional Types of Men and Women was a 1908 book arguing for gay liberation. who was an influential personality in the foundation of the Fabian Society and the Labour Party. After the Russian Revolution under the leadership of Lenin and Trotsky, the Soviet Union abolished previous laws against homosexuality. Harry Hay was an early leader in the American LGBT rights movement as well as a member of the Communist Party USA. He is known for his roles in helping to found gay organisations, including the Mattachine Society, the first sustained gay rights group in the United States which in its early days reflected a strong Marxist influence. The Encyclopedia of Homosexuality reports that "[a]s Marxists the founders of the group believed that the injustice and oppression which they suffered stemmed from relationships deeply embedded in the structure of American society". Emerging from events such as the May 1968 insurrection in France, the anti-Vietnam war movement in the US and the Stonewall riots of 1969, militant gay liberation organisations began to spring up around the world. Many sprang from left radicalism more than established homophile groups, although the Gay Liberation Front took an anti-capitalist stance and attacked the nuclear family and traditional gender roles.

Eco-socialism is a political strain merging aspects of socialism, Marxism or libertarian socialism with green politics, ecology and alter-globalisation. Eco-socialists generally claim that the expansion of the capitalist system is the cause of social exclusion, poverty, war and environmental degradation through globalisation and imperialism under the supervision of repressive states and transnational structures. Contrary to the depiction of Karl Marx by some environmentalists, social ecologists and fellow socialists as a productivist who favoured the domination of nature, eco-socialists revisited Marx's writings and believe that he "was a main originator of the ecological world-view". Marx discussed a "metabolic rift" between man and nature, stating that "private ownership of the globe by single individuals will appear quite absurd as private ownership of one man by another" and his observation that a society must "hand it [the planet] down to succeeding generations in an improved condition". English socialist William Morris is credited with developing principles of what was later called eco-socialism. During the 1880s and 1890s, Morris promoted his ideas within the Social Democratic Federation and Socialist League. Green anarchism blends anarchism with environmental issues. An important early influence was Henry David Thoreau and his book Walden as well as Élisée Reclus.

In the late 19th century, anarcho-naturism fused anarchism and naturist philosophies within individualist anarchist circles in France, Spain, Cuba and Portugal. Murray Bookchin's first book Our Synthetic Environment was followed by his essay "Ecology and Revolutionary Thought" which introduced ecology as a concept in radical politics. In the 1970s, Barry Commoner, claimed that capitalist technologies were chiefly responsible for environmental degradation as opposed to population pressures. In the 1990s socialist/feminists Mary Mellor and Ariel Salleh adopt an eco-socialist paradigm. An "environmentalism of the poor" combining ecological awareness and social justice has also become prominent. Pepper critiqued the current approach of many within green politics, particularly deep ecologists.

Syndicalism 

Syndicalism operates through industrial trade unions. It rejects state socialism and the use of establishment politics. Syndicalists reject state power in favour of strategies such as the general strike. Syndicalists advocate a socialist economy based on federated unions or syndicates of workers who own and manage the means of production. Some Marxist currents advocate syndicalism, such as De Leonism. Anarcho-syndicalism views syndicalism as a method for workers in capitalist society to gain control of an economy. The Spanish Revolution was largely orchestrated by the anarcho-syndicalist trade union CNT. The International Workers' Association is an international federation of anarcho-syndicalist labour unions and initiatives.

Criticism 

According to analytical Marxist sociologist Erik Olin Wright, "The Right condemned socialism as violating individual rights to private property and unleashing monstrous forms of state oppression", while "the Left saw it as opening up new vistas of social equality, genuine freedom and the development of human potentials."

Because of socialism's many varieties, most critiques have focused on a specific approach. Proponents of one approach typically criticise others. Socialism has been criticised in terms of its models of economic organization as well as its political and social implications. Other critiques are directed at the socialist movement, parties, or existing states.

Some forms of criticism occupy theoretical grounds, such as in the economic calculation problem presented by proponents of the Austrian School as part of the socialist calculation debate, while others support their criticism by examining historical attempts to establish socialist societies. The economic calculation problem concerns the feasibility and methods of resource allocation for a planned socialist system. Central planning is also criticized by elements of the radical left. Libertarian socialist economist Robin Hahnel notes that even if central planning overcame its inherent inhibitions of incentives and innovation, it would nevertheless be unable to maximize economic democracy and self-management, which he believes are concepts that are more intellectually coherent, consistent and just than mainstream notions of economic freedom.

Economic liberals and right-libertarians argue that private ownership of the means of production and market exchange are natural entities or moral rights which are central to freedom and liberty and argue that the economic dynamics of capitalism are immutable and absolute. As such, they also argue that public ownership of the means of production and economic planning are infringements upon liberty.

Critics of socialism have argued that in any society where everyone holds equal wealth, there can be no material incentive to work because one does not receive rewards for a work well done. They further argue that incentives increase productivity for all people and that the loss of those effects would lead to stagnation. Some critics of socialism argue that income sharing reduces individual incentives to work and therefore incomes should be individualized as much as possible.

Some philosophers have also criticized the aims of socialism, arguing that equality erodes away at individual diversities and that the establishment of an equal society would have to entail strong coercion.

Many commentators on the political right point to the mass killings under communist regimes, claiming them as an indictment of socialism. Opponents of this view, including supporters of socialism, state that these killings were aberrations caused by specific authoritarian regimes, and not caused by socialism itself, and point to mass deaths in famines, wars and massacres that they claim were caused by colonialism, capitalism and anti-communism as a counterpoint to those killings.

See also 
 Socialism/Is it a thing of the left?
 Anarchism and socialism
 Critique of work
 List of anti-capitalist and communist parties with national parliamentary representation
 List of communist ideologies
 List of socialist songs
 List of socialist states
 Paris Commune
 Scientific socialism
 Marxian critique of political economy
 Zenitism
 Socialism by country (category)

References

Bibliography

Further reading 

 
 
 
 
 
 
 
 
 
 
 
 
 
 
 
 
 
 George Lichtheim, A Short History of Socialism. Praeger Publishers, 1970.
 Alan Maass. The Case for Socialism. Haymarket Books, 2010 (Updated Edition). .
 Marx & Engels, Selected works in one volume, Lawrence and Wishart (1968) .
 Joshua Muravchik, Heaven on Earth: The Rise and Fall of Socialism , San Francisco: Encounter Books, 2002. .
 
 Bertell Ollman, ed., Market Socialism: The Debate among Socialists, Routledge, 1998. .
 Leo Panitch, Renewing Socialism: Democracy, Strategy, and Imagination. .
 Emile Perreau-Saussine, What remains of socialism?, in Patrick Riordan (dir.), Values in Public life: aspects of common goods (Berlin, LIT Verlag, 2007), pp. 11–34.
 
 
 
 Maximilien Rubel and John Crump, Non-Market Socialism in the Nineteenth and Twentieth Centuries. .
 Sassoon, Donald. One Hundred Years of Socialism: The West European Left in the Twentieth Century. New Press. 1998. .
 Bhaskar Sunkara (editor), The ABCs of Socialism. Verso, 2016. .
 Katherine Verdery, What Was Socialism, What Comes Next, Princeton. 1996. .
 
 James Weinstein, Long Detour: The History and Future of the American Left, Westview Press, 2003, hardcover, 272 pages. .
 Peter Wilberg, Deep Socialism: A New Manifesto of Marxist Ethics and Economics, 2003. .

External links 
 Socialism – entry at Encyclopædia Britannica
 
 
 Cuban Socialism from the Dean Peter Krogh Foreign Affairs Digital Archives.
 
 

 
Anti-capitalism
Anti-fascism
Economic ideologies
Economic systems
 
Political movements